The discography of American electronic dance music producer and DJ Slushii consists of four studio albums, three extended plays, sixteen singles, thirty remixes and three music videos.

Studio albums

Extended plays

Singles

As lead artist

As featured artist

Remixes

Music videos

References

Discographies of American artists
Electronic music discographies